Sir William Flood Webb  (21 January 1887 – 11 August 1972) was a judge of the Supreme Court of Queensland and the High Court of Australia. He was appointed President of the International Military Tribunal for the Far East by General Douglas MacArthur, commonly known as the Tokyo trial, after the end of World War II.

Early life and education
William Flood Webb was born in Brisbane, Queensland on 21 January 1887. He was educated at St Mary's School in Warwick, Queensland before graduating from the University of Queensland with a Bachelor of Laws degree. Webb was called to the bar in Queensland on 4 June 1913, after scoring a very high 71.5% on the bar examination on 20 May 1913.

Solicitor
In 1915, Webb was the State Public Defender for Queensland and, from 1917 to 1922, was the Crown Solicitor. He was promoted to be Solicitor-General of Queensland in 1922, a position he held until 1925.

Arbitration Court
Webb was also a Judge of the Commonwealth Court of Conciliation and Arbitration from 1922 to 1927 and, from 1925 to 1945, was President of the Queensland Court of Arbitration.

Supreme Court
Webb was appointed as a puisne judge on 24 April 1925 to the Supreme Court of Queensland. He held this position until, on 17 May 1940, he became senior puisne judge of the same court. On 27 June 1940 he was promoted to Chief Justice of the Supreme Court, an office he held until 15 May 1946, when he left to take a seat on the High Court of Australia.

In 1943, during his tenure on the court, Webb was appointed by the Government of Australia to investigate allegations of Japanese war crimes during World War II. Between 1943 and 1945, he produced three reports, known as the Webb reports, into crimes against Australian prisoners of war.  He also visited London in 1944 to give advice on his reports to the United Nations War Crimes Commission.

High Court

Webb began his tenure on the High Court of Australia in May 1946. During his tenure, he was President of the International Military Tribunal for the Far East, the tribunal which tried Japanese war crimes from World War II, from 1946 to 1948. Webb was involved in a minor scandal late in 1947, in the leadup to the bank nationalisation case, the Government of Australia tried to recall Webb from Tokyo, by requesting General Douglas MacArthur to release him, because they believed that he would decide the case in a way that was favourable to the Commonwealth. However, after pressure from Justice Owen Dixon, Chief Justice John Latham contacted Webb and encouraged him not to leave Japan.  On 12 November 1948, after more than two years of trials, Webb, as President of the Tribunal, handed down the sentences on all of the people whom the Tribunal had found guilty. Webb said that the series of trials conducted in Tokyo were the most "important criminal trials in all history."  Webb retired from the High Court on 16 May 1958 after serving exactly twelve years on the bench.

Personal life
On 17 March 1917, Webb married Beatrice Agnew at the Sacred Heart Church in Sandgate. They had four daughters and two sons. 

He died in Brisbane on 11 August 1972, and was buried in Nudgee Cemetery.

Honours
In 1942, Webb was made a Knight Bachelor for his services as Chief Justice of Queensland. In 1954, Webb was made a Knight Commander of the Order of the British Empire. In 1967, he was awarded an honorary Doctorate of Laws by the University of Queensland.

The road William Webb Drive in the district of Belconnen, Canberra is named after him.

References

See also
 Judiciary of Australia
 List of Judges of the Supreme Court of Queensland
 International Military Tribunal for the Far East

1887 births
1972 deaths
Justices of the High Court of Australia
Chief Justices of Queensland
Judges of the Supreme Court of Queensland
20th-century Australian judges
Australian Knights Bachelor
Australian Knights Commander of the Order of the British Empire
People from Brisbane
Judges of the International Military Tribunal for the Far East
Burials at Nudgee Cemetery
Australian judges of international courts and tribunals
Solicitors-General of Queensland
Public defenders